The following lists events that happened during 1895 in New Zealand.

Incumbents

Regal and viceregal
Head of State – Queen Victoria
Governor – David Boyle, 7th Earl of Glasgow

Government and law
The 12th New Zealand Parliament continues with the Liberal Party in power.

Speaker of the House – Sir Maurice O'Rorke
Prime Minister – Richard Seddon
Minister of Finance – Joseph Ward
Chief Justice – Hon Sir James Prendergast

Parliamentary opposition
Leader of the Opposition –  William Russell.

Main centre leaders
Mayor of Auckland – James Holland
Mayor of Christchurch – Thomas Gapes followed by Walter Cooper
Mayor of Dunedin – Henry Fish followed by Nathaniel Wales
Mayor of Wellington – Charles Luke

Events 
 July: The Waikato Advocate is published in Cambridge. It merged with the Waikato Times in 1896.
 12 August: Minnie Dean hanged for murder (the only woman to be executed in New Zealand).

Undated
 New Zealander Alexander von Tunzelmann becomes the first person to set foot on Antarctica, at Cape Adare

Arts and literature

Music

Sport

Athletics
National Champions, Men
100 yards – Alfred J. Patrick (Wellington)
250 yards – L. Broad (Canterbury)
440 yards – W. Low (Otago)
880 yards – W. Low (Otago)
1 mile – A. Davies (Auckland)
3 miles – A. Bell (Manawatu)
120 yards hurdles – W. Martin (Auckland)
440 yards hurdles – F. Harley (Wellington)
Long jump – J. Ryan (Hawkes Bay)
High jump – H. Bailey (Wanganui)
Pole vault – H. Kingsley (Wanganui)
Shot put – Charles M. Louisson (Canterbury)
Hammer throw – Charles M. Louisson (Canterbury)

Chess
National Champion: W. Mackay of Wellington.

Cricket

Golf
National amateur champion (men) – G. Gossett (Christchurch)
National amateur champion (women) – Mrs ? Melland

Horse racing

Harness racing
 Auckland Trotting Cup (over 2 miles) is won by Old Judge

Thoroughbred racing
 New Zealand Cup – Euroclydon
 New Zealand Derby – Euroclydon
 Auckland Cup – Anita
 Wellington Cup – Mahaki

Season leaders (1894/95)
Top New Zealand stakes earner – Mahaki
Leading flat jockey – R. Derrett

Lawn Bowls
National Champions
Singles – W. McLaren (Kaitangata)
Pairs – R. Struthers and W. Barnett (skip) (Christchurch)
Fours – H. Reid, A. Tapper, A. McDonald and T. Sneddon (skip) (Kaituna)

Polo
Savile Cup winners – Manawatu

Rowing
National Champions (Men)
Coxed fours – Queen's Dr, Port Chalmers
Coxless pairs – Union, Christchurch
Double sculls – Union, Christchurch
Single sculls – J. McGrath (Dunedin Amateur)

Rugby union
Provincial club rugby champions include: 
see also :Category:Rugby union in New Zealand

Shooting
Ballinger Belt – W. Ballinger (Petone Rifle Club)

Soccer
Provincial league champions:
Auckland:	Auckland United
Otago:	Roslyn Dunedin
Wellington:	Wellington Swifts

Swimming
National Champions (Men)
100 yards freestyle – L. Leo (New South Wales, Australia)
220 yards freestyle – L. Leo (New South Wales, Australia)
440 yards freestyle – L. Leo (New South Wales, Australia)
880 yards freestyle – L. Leo (New South Wales, Australia)

Tennis
National Championships
Men's singles – J. Hooper
Women's singles – K. Hitchings
Men's doubles – Richard Harman  and  Frederick Wilding
Women's doubles – C. Lean and E. Black

Births
 5 January: Eruera Tirikatene, politician.
 2 February: Ethel Gould, politician (MLC).
 1 April: Alexander Aitken, mathematician. 
 2 June: George Jobberns, academic.
 6 August: Cyril Brownlie, rugby union player.
 23 August: Thomas Ashby, mayor of Auckland 
 3 October: Ernest Toop (in England), politician, mayor of Wellington
 16 October: Keith Caldwell, WWI flying ace.
 9 December: Whina Cooper, Māori leader.
 23 December: Nola Luxford, Hollywood actress.

Deaths
 14 July: Ernest Gray, politician and farmer.
 7 September: Walter Mantell, scientist and politician.

See also
History of New Zealand
List of years in New Zealand
Military history of New Zealand
Timeline of New Zealand history
Timeline of New Zealand's links with Antarctica
Timeline of the New Zealand environment

References
General
 Romanos, J. (2001) New Zealand Sporting Records and Lists. Auckland: Hodder Moa Beckett. 
Specific

External links